Yingtan is a prefecture-level city in the east of Jiangxi province, People's Republic of China, bordering Fujian to the southeast. Its location near the trisection of Jiangxi, Fujian, and Zhejiang has made it a strategically important city for centuries. Today, it continues to be a major rail transport hub. It is best known as the Capital of Copper, and here placed Jiangxi Copper and its smelting factory.

Near the city of Yingtan is the resort area Mount Longhu which purports to be the birthplace of Taoism and hence has great symbolic value to Taoists.  The region has many interesting temples, cave complexes, mountains and villages.

Administration
The municipal executive, legislature and judiciary are in Yuehu District, together with the CPC and Public Security bureaux.

Yingtan oversees two districts and a county-level city:
Yuehu District
Yujiang District
Guixi City

Tourism Zone
 Longhu Mountain Scenic Area

Climate

Notes and references

External links
  Official Yingtan city website

 
Cities in Jiangxi
Prefecture-level divisions of Jiangxi